Local elections were held in South Korea on 4 June 1998. A total of seven metropolitan city mayors, nine provincial governors, 680 provincial-level councilors, 232 municipal-level mayors and 3,490 municipal-level councilors were elected.

Metropolitan city mayoral elections

Seoul

Busan

Daegu

Incheon

Gwangju

Daejeon

Ulsan

Gubernatorial elections

Gyeonggi

Gangwon

North Chungcheong

South Chungcheong

North Jeolla

South Jeolla

North Gyeongsang

South Gyeongsang

Jeju

Provincial-level council elections

Summary

Constituency seats

Proportional representation seats

Municipal-level mayoral elections

Summary

By region

Municipal-level council elections 
3,490 seats in municipal-level councils were contested by candidates running as independents.

References

Local elections in South Korea
1998 elections in South Korea